Chariessa dichroa is a species of checkered beetle, belonging to the genus Chariessa. It is found in North America, most commonly on the West Coast. C. dichroa is distinguished from similar members of its genus by its black legs. Like other Chariessa beetles, it is carnivorous.

References

Further reading

 

Cleridae
Articles created by Qbugbot
Beetles described in 1865